Bronisław Wilhelm Pieracki (28 May 1895 in Gorlice – 15 June 1934 in Warsaw) was a Polish military officer and politician.

Life
As a member of the Polish Legions in World War I, Pieracki took part in the Polish-Ukrainian War (1918–1919). He later supported Józef Piłsudski's May 1926 Coup. 

In 1928 Pieracki was a deputy in the Polish Sejm from the Nonpartisan Bloc for Cooperation with the Government, and afterward deputy Chief of Staff .

He was minister of internal affairs from 27 May 1931 until his 1934 assassination, and was posthumously awarded Poland's highest civilian and military decoration, the Order of the White Eagle.

Assassination

On 15 June 1934, Pieracki was assassinated by a member of the Organization of Ukrainian Nationalists. His death gave Poland's Sanation government a justification to create, two days after the assassination, the Bereza Kartuska Prison. The prison's first detainees were almost entirely the leadership of the Polish nationalist far-right National Radical Camp (the ONR), arrested on 6–7 July 1934.

Sentenced to death in the Pieracki assassination were Stepan Bandera and Mykola Lebed.  Their sentences were commuted to life imprisonment, and both managed to escape during the invasion of Poland.

Honours and awards
 Order of White Eagle
 Order of Polonia Restituta
 Silver Cross of the Virtuti Militari
 Cross of Valour - four times
 Gold Cross of Merit
 Order of the Cross of the Eagle Class I (Estonia, 1934)

See also
 Tadeusz Hołówko
 Mykola Lebed

References

Further reading
 Andrzej Misiuk Białym żelazem, Gazeta Wyborcza, 12/07/1994.

1895 births
1934 deaths
People from Gorlice
Nonpartisan Bloc for Cooperation with the Government politicians
Assassinated Polish politicians
Interior ministers of Poland
Polish Army officers
Polish legionnaires (World War I)
People murdered in Poland
Recipients of the Order of Polonia Restituta
Recipients of the Silver Cross of the Virtuti Militari
Recipients of the Cross of Valour (Poland)
Recipients of the Gold Cross of Merit (Poland)
Recipients of the Military Order of the Cross of the Eagle, Class I
Victims of the Organization of Ukrainian Nationalists
Recipients of the Order of the White Eagle (Poland)